Lampič is a surname. Notable people with the surname include:

 Anamarija Lampič (born 1995), Slovenian cross-country skier
 Janez Lampič (born 1963), Yugoslav cyclist
 Janez Lampič (skier) (born 1996), Slovenian cross-country skier 

Slovene-language surnames